Allentsteig is a municipality in the district of Zwettl, in Lower Austria, Austria.

Just outside Allentsteig there is a German World War II cemetery with almost 3,900 graves. Mainly German soldiers who were killed in the final battles of World War II - trying to prevent the Russian advances into Austria and Germany. The cemetery is located just outside an Austrian military training facility.

Population

References

External links 

Cities and towns in Zwettl District